Redcoats and Rebels: The American Revolution through British Eyes is a history of the American Revolutionary War (using its British name of "The American War of Independence") from the British perspective by historian Christopher Hibbert. The book was first published in 1990.

Chapter summary 
Chapter 1: Sons of Liberty
 
"One Single act of Parliament has set people a-thinking in six months more than they had ever done in their whole lives before." – James Otis, Jr. 
	
Chapter 2: First Blood
"The die is cast, and more mischief will follow." – William Knox

Chapter 3: Bunker Hill
"I wish we could sell them another hill at the same price." – Nathaniel Greene

Chapter 4: Washington Takes Command
"Everyone is made to know his place and keep in it" – William Emerson (minister)

Chapter 5: 'An Ugly Job'
"The ardour of this nation in this cause has not arisen to the pitch on could wish" – Lord North

Chapter 6: The War In Canada
"One or two dogs were killed which the soldiers ate with good appetite, even the feet and skins." – Major R. J. Meigs

Chapter 7: Disasters in Virginia
"I never was uneasy on not having a retreat, because I never imagined the enemy could force me to that necessity" – William Moultrie

In December 1775, Captain Charles Fordyce led a group of loyalists and black slaves on an attack of approximately 900 colonists under the command of Colonel William Woodford. The battle took place 20 miles south of Norfolk, Virginia. Fordyce and many of his men died. The colonists suffered few casualties, and they allowed the British troops to retreat out of pity without continuing to fire.

A similar force was raised in North Carolina, however, even after a small victory over some colonists this force was not seen as a great benefit to the British Military. General Henry Clinton began to realize that the loyalists would not be able to continue the fight against the rebels on their own, nor would they be able to defend themselves once the British troops were gone.

General Henry Clinton decided to take his force North to attack and capture Charleston as well as the Fort on Sullivan's Island. The American Commander on Sullivan's Island was General William Moultrie who built a fort out of rudimentary supplies to defend Charleston. In the attempt to take the island the British lost approximately 200 men and the Colonists lost only a dozen.

Chapter 8: The Declaration of Independence
"How is it that we hear the loudest yelps for liberty among the drivers of Negroes?" – Samuel Johnson

Chapter 9: The Battle for New York
"There is something exceedingly mysterious in the conduct of the enemy" – George Washington

Chapter 10: Generals at Loggerheads
"We never had agreed upon any single question" – Sir William Howe

Chapter 11: Winter on the Delaware
"Many of our soldiers had not a shoe to their feet and their clothes were ragged as those of a beggar" – John Greenwood (dentist)

Chapter 12: The Fall of Philadelphia
"They decamped with the utmost precipitation, and in the greatest confusion" – Robert Morton

Chapter 13: The Army of the North
"I little foresaw that I was to be left to pursue my way through such a tract of country, and hosts of foes, without any co-operation from New York." – John Burgoyne

Chapter 14: Surrender at Saratoga
"This day General Burguine Sined the Articles of Capitilation … and the whole army Capilated and the general officers came out in the fore Noon & in the afternoon the rest of the Armey came out and they wair two hours a marching out." – Solomon Dwinnell

Chapter 15: The English Debate
"Not one of the Ministers knew what to say, and so said nothing" – Horace Walpole

Chapter 16: Intrigues at Valley Forge
"They worry one another like Mastiffs." – John Adams

Chapter 17: Fighting at Monmouth Court House
"Sir, these troops are not able to meet British grenadiers" – Charles Lee (general)

Chapter 18: Enemies of the French
"There are not ships enough in readiness to form a squadron fit to meet the Toulon fleet" – John Montagu, 4th Earl of Sandwich

Editions
First published:
1990: Grafton Books as a Hardcover, 375-page publication.

Following editions include:
April 2002: Norton paperback, 375-page publication.
2006: Folio Society Hhardcover, 400-page publication.
February 2008: Pen and Sword paperback, 384-page publication.

History books about the American Revolution
Books by Christopher Hibbert
1990 non-fiction books